Pseudolaguvia foveolata is a species of sisorid catfish from the Tista River, which is a tributary of the Brahmaputra River in northern West Bengal, India.

References

Catfish of Asia
Fish of India
Taxa named by Heok Hee Ng
Fish described in 2005
Erethistidae